Väre is a Finnish surname. Notable people with the surname include:

 Emil Väre (1885–1974), Finnish wrestler
 Eero Väre (born 1984), Finnish ice hockey player
 Hjalmar Väre (1892–1952), Finnish road racing cyclist

See also
 Vare (disambiguation)

Finnish-language surnames